Financial World was an American magazine for investors from 1902 to 1998. It was originally issued weekly, and later every two weeks. In the magazine's later years of publication, its signature issue was the "Sports Franchise Valuation Issue". In its last years this feature was prepared by Andrew Zimbalist who is now a contributor to Forbes.

History
Financial World was founded in 1902 by Louis Guenther in Chicago and later moved to New York. It was purchased in 1983 by Carl Lindner, Jr. and later sold to Barry Rupp, Steve Rupp, and Timothy Draper in 1995. In 1998, the magazine stopped printing and closed its business.

As of 1983, it specialized in information for individual investors.

Bronze Award recipients
 Jim Zahrt
 Raymond Mundt, 1982
 Rick de Lome
 Amy Ink, 1990
 Donald Haberek, 1993
 Mary Lynn Van Dyken
 Ronald L. Bittner, 1994/1995
 Brian Engel, 1996

Notable alumni
 Stacey Bradford, financial journalist, author, and commentator
 Dan Dorfman, television and print commentator and columnist 
 Seth Hoyt, former publisher of Cosmopolitan Magazine
 Douglas McIntyre, technology entrepreneur
 Anson Weston Smith, executive vice-president, father of the famous radio DJ ‘Wolfman Jack’ 
 John Hancock Willing Rhein III Sr. VP, Associate Publisher 1973/1982

References

Business magazines published in the United States
Defunct magazines published in the United States
Magazines established in 1902
Magazines disestablished in 1998